KGNG may refer to:

 KGNG-LD, a low-power television station (channel 26) licensed to serve Las Vegas, Nevada, United States
 KGNG-LP, a defunct low-power television station (channel 47) formerly licensed to serve Las Vegas, Nevada
 the ICAO code for Gooding Municipal Airport in Gooding, Idaho, United States